Anomis texana is a species of moth in the family Erebidae. It is found in North America.

The MONA or Hodges number for Anomis texana is 8550.

References

Further reading

 
 
 

Scoliopteryginae
Articles created by Qbugbot
Moths described in 1885